Qarshi District is a district of Qashqadaryo Region in Uzbekistan. The capital lies at the city Qarshi. The district consists of one city (Beshkent), 15 urban-type settlements (Fayzobod, Saroy, Gʻubdin, Lagʻmon, Kuchkak, Xonobod, Shilvi, Qovchin, Nuqrabod, Yertepa, Navroʻz, Jumabozor, Mustaqillik, Mirmiron Yangi xayot) and 15 rural communities.

References

Qashqadaryo Region
Districts of Uzbekistan